Only Human may refer to:

Film and television 
 Only Human (2004 film) (Seres queridos), a Spanish-Argentine film
 Only Human (2010 film), an Irish experimental film
 Only Human (TV programme), a British documentary programme
 "Only Human", an episode of The Transformers
 "Only Human", an episode of Teen Titans

Literature

Novels
 Only Human (Doctor Who), a 2005 novel by Gareth Roberts
 Only Human, a novel by Jenny Diski
 Only Human, a novel by Tom Holt 
 Only Human, a novel in the Fourth World trilogy by Kate Thompson

Short stories
 "Only Human" (short story), a 2003 story by Eileen Wilks
 "Only Human", a short story by Cormac Cullinan
 "Only Human", a short story by John Strange Winter

Music

Albums
 Only Human (Dina Carroll album) (1996)
 Only Human (Cheryl album) (2014)
 Only Human (Crease album) (2004)
 Only Human (Hal Crook album) (1993)
 Only Human (Calum Scott album) (2018)
 Only Human, an album by 12 Stones
 Only Human, an album by Amon Düül II
 Only Human, an album by At Vance
 Only Human, an album by Toploader

Songs
 "Only Human" (Cheryl song) (2014)
 "Only Human" (Example song) (2014)
 "Only Human" (Delta Goodrem song) (2015)
 "Only Human" (Jonas Brothers song) (2019)
 "Only Human", a song by Jason Mraz from We Sing. We Dance. We Steal Things.
 "Only Human", a song by K from Beyond the Sea

See also
 "You're Only Human (Second Wind)", a 1985 song by Billy Joel